Zygaena dorycnii is a species of moth in the family Zygaenidae. It is found in Ukraine, Russia, Turkey and Armenia.

It has spots and a red belt, which does not reach all round the abdomen as in the otherwise similar peucedani, not being continued on the underside.  — In senescens Stgr. [ now Zygaena ephialtes ssp. senescens Staudinger, 1887 ], from Tauria, the anterior basal spot of the forewing, the hindwing and the abdominal belt are dark rose-colour, the other spots of the forewing being white, with a yellow tint.

The larvae feed on Lotus corniculatus.

Subspecies
Zygaena dorycnii dorycnii
Zygaena dorycnii karabaghensis Holik & Sheljuzhko, 1958
Zygaena dorycnii keredjensis Reiss, 1937
Zygaena dorycnii kertshensis (Obraztsov, 1935)
Zygaena dorycnii kubana Holik & Sheljuzhko, 1958
Zygaena dorycnii teberdensis Reiss, 1936

References

Moths described in 1808
Zygaena
Moths of Europe
Moths of Asia